Driving Home the Cows is a 1912 American silent film produced by Kalem Company. It was directed by Sidney Olcott with Alice Hollister and Leo Berger. The film was shot in Jacksonville.

Cast

 Gene Gauntier
 Alice Hollister
 Jack Clark
 Leo Berger 
 Bill Holiday
 T. A. Riggs

References
 The Kalem Kalendar, December 15, 1911, p 7
 The New York Dramatic Mirror, January 12, 1912, p 31
 The Moving Picture World, vol 10, p 966; p 994; vol 11, p 126

External links
 Driving Home the Cows website dedicated to Sidney Olcott

1912 films
American silent short films
American black-and-white films
Films directed by Sidney Olcott
1910s adventure drama films
1912 short films
American adventure drama films
1912 drama films
1910s American films
Silent American drama films
Silent adventure drama films
American drama short films
1910s English-language films